PP-256 Rahim Yar Khan-II is a Constituency of Dera Ghazi Khan Provincial Assembly of Punjab.

General elections 2013

General elections 2008

See also
 PP-255 Rahim Yar Khan-I
 PP-257 Rahim Yar Khan-III

References

External links
 Election commission Pakistan's official website
 Awazoday.com check result
 Official Website of Government of Punjab

Provincial constituencies of Punjab, Pakistan